The following electrical connectors are commonly used in aviation headsets:

Phone connectors
A pair of plugs, known as "GA" or general aviation plugs. 1/4-inch plug for audio, and a 3/16-inch plug for the microphone
The TP-120 (also known as J11) is standard for external jack plugs on most Boeing and Airbus airliners, used by ground-crew
U-384/U (Nexus TP-105), similar to U-174/U but with 5 conductors and slightly longer length of 
NATO Stock Number 5935-99-946-6652.
XLR 5, used internally on Airbus aircraft
REDEL 6-pin connector by LEMO, known as "LEMO plugs". Most Cirrus aircraft use this connector.
Fischer 8-pin connector, used in Agusta helicopters
Neutrik neutriCON 8-pin connector

The XLR, LEMO and Fischer plugs are able to supply power for active noise cancellation.

References

Aviation-related lists
Aviation communications